The New Mexico A&M Aggies football program from 1893 to 1899 represented the represented New Mexico College of Agriculture and Mechanical Arts (now known as New Mexico State University) in its first decade of intercollegiate football.

1893

The 1893 New Mexico A&M Aggies football team represented New Mexico A&M during the 1893 college football season and was the school's first intercollegiate football team. The team played only one game, losing to New Mexico on January 1, 1894. W. M. Clute was the coach.

Schedule

1895

The 1895 New Mexico A&M Aggies football team represented New Mexico A&M during the 1895 college football season and was the school's second intercollegiate football team. The team played two games, compiling a 2–0 record. Alfred Holt was the coach.

Schedule

1896

The 1896 New Mexico A&M Aggies football team represented New Mexico A&M during the 1896 college football season. The team played two games, compiling a 0–2 record.

Schedule

1897

The 1897 New Mexico A&M Aggies football team represented New Mexico A&M during the 1897 college football season. In its first season under head coach Charles M. Barber, the team compiled a 1–0–1 record.

Schedule

1898

The 1898 New Mexico A&M Aggies football team represented New Mexico A&M during the 1897 college football season. In its second season under head coach Charles M. Barber, the team compiled a 2–1 record.

Schedule

1899

The 1899 New Mexico A&M Aggies football team was an American football team that represented New Mexico College of Agriculture and Mechanical Arts (now known as New Mexico State University) during the 1899 college football season.  In their first year under head coach John O. Miller, the Aggies compiled a 1–0 record. In the team's only game, the Aggies defeated the team from the U.S. Indian School by a 38–0 score. The team played its home games on College Field, later renamed Miller Field in honor of coach Miller.

Schedule

References

1894
New Mexico A&M
New Mexico A&M
New Mexico A&M
New Mexico A&M
New Mexico A&M
New Mexico A&M